The men's large hill K125 individual competition at the 2011 Asian Winter Games in Almaty, Kazakhstan was held on 31 January at the International Ski Jump Complex.

Schedule
All times are Almaty Time (UTC+06:00)

Results

References

Large Hill Individual Results

External links
 Official website

Large